Elizabeth T. Borer is an American ecologist and a professor of ecology, Evolution and Behavior in the College of Biological Sciences at the University of Minnesota.

Early life and education 
Born in Pennsylvania, Borer graduated from Oberlin College in 1991, spent several years working outside academia, then returned to earn her Ph.D. in ecology, Evolution, and Marine Biology at the University of California, Santa Barbara in 2002 (advised by William W. Murdoch and Allan Stewart-Oaten). She went on to do postdoctoral training in the Integrative Biology Department at University of California, Berkeley with Cheryl Briggs, then a second postdoc at the National Center for Ecological Analysis and Synthesis. She was an assistant professor in the Zoology Department at Oregon State University (2004-2009) and an Associate and Full Professor at the University of Minnesota (2010–present).

Research 
Elizabeth Borer studies how ecological communities are impacted by large environmental changes such as nitrogen deposition, carbon dioxide emissions, invasive species or extinction of species. She is an empiricist and experimentalist, but uses mathematical modeling to guide her hypotheses. In 2006, she was among the scientists who conceived the Nutrient Network, a collaborative research project studying global change in grasslands by replicating experiments at 140 sites in 27 different countries on 6 continents. In 2019, she helped launch DRAGNet (Disturbance and Resources Across Global Grasslands), a collaborative global research project to assess the impact of human activity on ecosystems.

Honors and awards 

Lee Segel Prize, Society for Mathematical Biology (with PhD student, Sean Moore) (2012)
Fellow, Leopold Leadership Program (2015)
Fellow, Institute on the Environment (2016)
Plenary address at the XXVIII Reunión Argentina de Ecología (XXVIII Ecological Society of Argentina) meeting in Oct, 2018, in Mar del Plata, Argentina. "Cutting edge global science on a small budget: nutrients, herbivores, and future grasslands on Earth"
Fellow, Ecological Society of America (2019)
Fellow, American Association for the Advancement of Science (2020)

Representative publications 

 Pell, B., Kendig, A. E., Borer, E. & Kuang, Y., Jan 1 2019.  Modeling nutrient and disease dynamics in a plant-pathogen system. Mathematical Biosciences and Engineering. 16, 1, p. 234-26431
 Kohli, M., Borer, E., Kinkel, L. L. & Seabloom, E., Jan 1 2019, Stability of grassland production is robust to changes in the consumer food web. Ecology Letters.
 Hillebrand, H., Blasius, B., Borer, E. T., Chase, J. M., Downing, J. A., Eriksson, B. K., Filstrup, C. T., Harpole, W. S., Hodapp, D., Larsen, S., Lewandowska, A. M., Seabloom, E. W., Van de Waal, D. B. & Ryabov, A. B., Jan 1 2018, In : Journal of Applied Ecology. 55, 1, p. 169-180
Mortensen, B., Danielson, B., Harpole, W. S., Alberti, J., Arnillas, C. A., Biederman, L., Borer, E., Cadotte, M. W., Dwyer, J. M., Hagenah, N., Hautier, Y., Peri, P. L. & Seabloom, E., Jan 1 2018. Herbivores safeguard plant diversity by reducing variability in dominance.  Journal of Ecology. 106, 1, p. 101-112
Anderson, T. M., Griffith, D. M., Grace, J. B., Lind, E. M., Adler, P. B., Biederman, L. A., Blumenthal, D. M., Daleo, P., Firn, J., Hagenah, N., Harpole, W. S., MacDougall, A. S., McCulley, R. L., Prober, S. M., Risch, A. C., Sankaran, M., Schütz, M., Seabloom, E. W., Stevens, C. J., Sullivan, L. L. & 2 others, Apr 1 2018. Herbivory and eutrophication mediate grassland plant nutrient responses across a global climatic gradient.  Ecology. 99, 4, p. 822-831
 Borer, E.T. et al. (54 Nutrient Network coauthors). 2014.  Herbivores and nutrients control grassland plant diversity via light limitation. Nature 508, 517–520
 Borer, E.T., W.S. Harpole, P.B. Adler, E.M. Lind, J.L. Orrock, E.W. Seabloom, M.D. Smith. 2014.  Finding generality in ecology: A model for globally distributed experiments.  Methods in Ecology and Evolution. 5(1): 65–73.
Borer, E.T., E.W. Seabloom, and D. Tilman. 2012.  Plant diversity controls arthropod biomass and temporal stability.  Ecology Letters. doi: 10.1111/ele.12006
Borer, E.T., J. Antonovics, L.L. Kinkel, P.J. Hudson, P. Daszak, M.J. Ferrari, K.A. Garrett, C.R. Parrish, A.F. Read, D.M. Rizzo. 2011. Bridging taxonomic and disciplinary divides in infectious disease. EcoHealth 8(3):261-267.
Adler, P.B., E.W. Seabloom, E.T. Borer (and 55 Nutrient Network coauthors). 2011. Productivity is a poor predictor of plant species richness. Science 333:1750-1753.
Borer, E. T., C. E. Mitchell, A. G. Power, and E. W. Seabloom. 2009. Consumers indirectly increase infection risk in grassland food webs. Proceedings of the National Academy of Sciences 106(2):503-506.
Borer, E. T., C. J. Briggs, and R. D. Holt. 2007. Predators, parasitoids, and pathogens: a cross-cutting examination of intraguild predation theory. Ecology 88(11): 2681–2688.
Borer, E. T., P. R. Hosseini, E. W. Seabloom, A. P. Dobson. 2007. Pathogen-induced reversal of native perennial dominance in a grassland community. Proceedings of the National Academy of Sciences 104(13): 5473–5478.
Borer, E. T., E. W. Seabloom, J. B. Shurin, K. E. Anderson, C. A. Blanchette, B. Broitman, S. D. Cooper, B. S. Halpern. 2005. What determines the strength of a trophic cascade? Ecology 86(2):528-537.

References

External links 
 

Living people
Year of birth missing (living people)
American women biologists
Oberlin College alumni
University of California, Santa Barbara alumni
University of Minnesota faculty
Oregon State University faculty
American ecologists
Women ecologists
Fellows of the American Association for the Advancement of Science
Fellows of the Ecological Society of America
21st-century American women